Pawan Tiwari is an Indian actor/producer. He has been seen in many TV shows and films. He turned producer with the feature film Dozakh in Search of Heaven. under his production company name "Jalsa Pictures". His company made Alif and Nakkash.

Personal life

Tiwari was born in Basti (now Siddarthnagar, UP) into a strong political family. His love and passion for cinema has brought him to Mumbai. Pawan attended ST.Joseph School, Basti and later graduated from Delhi University. He is a diploma holder in Fashion Designing from IIFT, Delhi. He learned initial acting at summer courses from NSD and has acted in theaters before turning a professional.

Career

Tiwari has acted in multiple TV serials such as Do Dil Ek Jaan on Life Ok, Piya Ka Ghar Pyaara Lage.  on Sahara One, Haunted Nights and Kismat Connection  on Sahara One, and Black on 9X. He has also acted in films such as Pranali (2008) and Dozakh in Search of Heaven which is his first production venture. The film received attention when Amitabh Bachchan praised it. His next film as an  actor and producer was Alif, which was released on 3 February 2017..Nakkash is his third film as an actor/producer released on 31 May 2019.

Filmography

References

External links

 
 
 

Living people
21st-century Indian male actors
Film producers from Uttar Pradesh
Year of birth missing (living people)
Indian male film actors
Indian male television actors
People from Basti
Male actors from Uttar Pradesh